Bishop Airport  is a privately owned public-use airport located six nautical miles (6.9 mi, 11.1 km) east of the central business district of Decatur, a city in Wise County, Texas, United States.

Facilities and aircraft 
Bishop Airport has one runway designated 17/35 with a turf surface measuring 3,730 by 170 feet (1,137 x 52 m). For the 12-month period ending September 3, 2008, the airport had 300 general aviation aircraft operations, an average of 25 per month.

References

External links 
  at Texas DOT Airport Directory
 Aerial image as of January 1995 from USGS The National Map
 

Airports in Texas
Buildings and structures in Wise County, Texas
Transportation in Wise County, Texas